Ricardo Lingan Baccay (born April 3, 1961) is the fourth Archbishop of the Archdiocese of Tuguegarao.

Biography
Ricardo Lingan Baccay was born in Tuguegarao on April 3, 1961. He attended the secondary schools at the San Jacinto seminary and did his studies in philosophy and theology at the University of Santo Tomas in Manila. He was subsequently awarded a Master of Arts at the Lyceum of Aparri and a doctorate in educational management from the University of Manila. He  was ordained a priest together with Bishop Danilo Ulep of Batanes on April 10, 1987 by Archbishop Diosdado Aenlle Talamayan.

On February 3, 2007, Pope Benedict XVI appointed him Auxiliary Bishop of Tuguegarao and Titular Bishop of Gabala. He was consecrated bishop on April 10, 2007 by Fernando Filoni, Apostolic Nuncio to the Philippines. Co-consecrators were Diosdado Aenlle Talamayan, Archbishop of Tuguegarao ; and Sergio Lasam Utleg, Bishop of Laoag.

On February 20, 2016, Pope Francis appointed him as the third Bishop of the Diocese of Alaminos in Pangasinan. After three years, on October 18, 2019, Pope Francis appointed him as the Fourth Archbishop of Tuguegarao in Cagayan following the resignation of Archbishop Sergio Utleg and returning him to the Ecclesiastical Province of Tuguegarao.

References

External links

1961 births
People from Tuguegarao
Living people
Bishops appointed by Pope Benedict XVI
Roman Catholic bishops of Tuguegarao
Roman Catholic archbishops of Tuguegarao
Filipino Roman Catholics